Old Courthouse, also known as the Second St. Joseph County Courthouse, is a historic courthouse located at South Bend, St. Joseph County, Indiana. It was designed by architect John M. Van Osdel (1811-1891) and built in 1853. It is a two-story, Greek Revival style stone building.  The building measures 61 feet wide and 93 feet deep.  It features a projecting front portico supported by Doric order columns and a front gable roof topped by a cupola.  It was moved to its present site in 1896. Following construction of the Third St. Joseph County Courthouse, the building housed the local G.A.R. chapter and historical museum. The building now houses office of the Traffic and Misdemeanor Court and Small Claims Court.

It was listed on the National Register of Historic Places in 1970.  It is located in the West Washington Historic District.

References

External links

Historic American Buildings Survey in Indiana
County courthouses in Indiana
Courthouses on the National Register of Historic Places in Indiana
Greek Revival architecture in Indiana
Government buildings completed in 1853
Buildings and structures in South Bend, Indiana
National Register of Historic Places in St. Joseph County, Indiana
Historic district contributing properties in Indiana